Linda Cathrine Hofstad Helleland (born 26 August 1977 in Klæbu) is a Norwegian politician for the Conservative Party. She served as Minister of Districts and Digitalization from 2020 to 2021. She previously served as Minister of Culture from 2015-2018 and Minister of Children and Equality from 2018-2019.
She also served as Vice President of the World Anti-Doping Association from 2016 to 2019.

Career

Parliament
She served as a deputy representative in the Norwegian Parliament from Sør-Trøndelag during the terms 2001–2005 and 2005–2009. During the entire first term she sat as a regular representative, replacing Børge Brende, who was appointed to the second cabinet Bondevik. She again returned to a parliamentary seat when Brende was employed by the World Economic Forum.

Local politics
Hofstad was a member of Trondheim city council from 1999 to 2001.

Vice President of WADA
Hofstad Helleland was in 2016 elected vice president of the World Anti-Doping Agency representing governments in WADAs Foundation Board and Executive Committee.

Personal life
She is married to Trond Helleland and has two sons.

References

External sources

1977 births
Living people
Conservative Party (Norway) politicians
Members of the Storting
Politicians from Trondheim
Ministers of Culture of Norway
World Anti-Doping Agency members
21st-century Norwegian politicians
Ministers of Children, Equality and Social Inclusion of Norway